Events from the year 1722 in Russia

Incumbents
 Monarch – Peter I

Events

 
  : The Russo-Persian War begins.

Births

 Anna Matyushkina, courtier  (d. 1804)
 Anna Vorontsova

Deaths

References

1722 in Russia
Years of the 18th century in the Russian Empire